Taiwanese Language Phonetic Alphabet, more commonly known by its initials TLPA, is a romanization system for the Taiwanese language, Taiwanese Hakka language, and Formosan languages. Based on Pe̍h-ōe-jī and first published in full in 1998, it was intended as a transcription system rather than as a full-fledged orthography.

References

Languages of Taiwan
Romanization of Hokkien
Writing systems introduced in the 1990s
1998 establishments in Taiwan